One-Trick Pony may refer to:

Music
 One-Trick Pony (album), a 1980 studio album by Paul Simon, and a song on the album
 "One Trick Pony", a song by deadmau5 featuring SOFI from the 2010 album 4×4=12
 "One Trick Pony", a single by Nelly Furtado featuring Kronos Quartet from the 2003 album Folklore
 "One Trick Pony", a song from the 2008 album Lightbulbs by Fujiya & Miyagi 
 "One Trick Pony", a song from the 1999 album This Shit Is Genius by Dillinger Four
 "One Trick Pony", a 2006 single by Joe Brown

Television
 "One Trick Pony", a 2014 episode of TV series BoJack Horseman (season 1)
 "One Trick Pony", a 2007 episode of TV series Heartland

Other uses
 One-Trick Pony (film), a 1980 film starring Paul Simon
 One Trick Pony (magazine), edited by Louis McKee

See also
 Trick Pony, an American country music band
 "Trick Pony", a song from Charlotte Gainsbourg's album Stage Whisperer
 Aaron Judge, MLB outfielder for the New York Yankees